Mike or Michael Hall may refer to:

People

Performing arts
Michael Hall (actor) (1926–2020), American actor
Anthony Michael Hall (Michael Anthony Hall, born 1968), American actor
Michael Hall (musician) (active 1985–), American singer-songwriter
Michael Hall (English musician) (1932–2012), violinist and conductor
Mike Hall (musician) (born 1989), American bassist
Michael C. Hall (born 1971), American actor

Politics
Michael H. Hall (1890–1957), Wisconsin state assemblyman
Mike Hall (British politician) (born 1952)
Mike Hall (West Virginia politician) (born 1948)

Science
Michael B. Hall, American chemist
Michael N. Hall (born 1953), American and Swiss molecular biologist

Sports
Michael Hall (cricketer) (1935–2019), English cricketer
Michael Hall (archer) (born 1975), British Paralympic archer
Mike Hall (basketball) (born 1984), American-Irish basketball player
Mike Hall (cyclist) (1981–2017), British cyclist and race organiser
Mike Hall (powerlifter) (born 1956), American powerlifter
Mike Hall (rugby union) (born 1965), Welsh rugby union international
Mike Hall (speed skater) (born 1970), Canadian speed skater

Others
Mike Hall (journalist) (born 1974), British
Mike Hall (sportscaster) (born 1982), American
Michael G. Hall (born 1926), American educator, historian and academic

Schools
Michael Hall (school) (founded 1925), East Sussex